The Jungle Pyramid is Volume 56 in the original The Hardy Boys Mystery Stories published by Grosset & Dunlap.

This book was written for the Stratemeyer Syndicate by Vincent Buranelli in 1977.

Plot summary

Somebody steals gold from the Wakefield Mint without even triggering the alarm. The Hardy Boys must track the gold down. Then, after that, the Early Art Museum is robbed of a gold artifact. Their main suspect is a man named Pedro Zemog, who ran out of the museum after the alarm was triggered. A strange note with Zemog's name on it sends them to Zurich, where somebody claims to know about the Wakefield gold theft. Then another note with Zemog's name on it sends the boys to Mexico City, where they discover a pyramid in the jungle. In the pyramid are many gold coins and sculptures. Afterward,

References

The Hardy Boys books
1977 American novels
1977 children's books
Novels set in Mexico
Grosset & Dunlap books